Ernest William Perry (3 November 1891 – 31 May 1979) was an English footballer who played in the Football League for Port Vale and Crewe Alexandra between 1919 and 1924; he was also signed to Stoke and Bradford City.

Career
Perry played for Stoke before joining Port Vale in August 1919, just before they joined the Football League to take over the fixtures of financially troubled Leeds City, who were expelled from the Second Division two months into the season. He played 26 Second Division games in the 1919–20 season, and scored his first goal in the Football League on 1 January, in a 4–3 defeat to Fulham at The Old Recreation Ground. He was also in the sides that won the Staffordshire Cup and shared the North Staffordshire Infirmary Cup in 1920. He fell out of favour somewhat during the 1920–21 season, playing 18 league games (with one goal), and is believed to have been released at the end of that campaign. In 1921, he moved to First Division side Bradford City, but never played a game, and instead joined Crewe Alexandra. He played 62 Third Division North games for the "Railwaymen", who finished in sixth place in 1921–22 and 1922–23, before a decline at Gresty Road saw them drop to 20th place in 1923–24.

Career statistics
Source:

Honours
Port Vale
Staffordshire Senior Cup: 1920
North Staffordshire Infirmary Cup: 1920

References

1891 births
1979 deaths
Sportspeople from Wednesbury
English footballers
Association football midfielders
Stoke City F.C. players
Port Vale F.C. players
Bradford City A.F.C. players
Crewe Alexandra F.C. players
English Football League players